Highs in the Mid-Sixties, Volume 2 (subtitled LA '66 / Riot on Sunset Strip) is a compilation album in the Highs in the Mid-Sixties series, featuring recordings that were released in Los Angeles, California.  (Despite the subtitle, not all of these records were originally released in 1966).  The subtitle is taken from Riot on Sunset Strip (a movie that was actually released in 1967); the film features live performances by two classic garage-rock bands, the Standells (featured on Highs in the Mid-Sixties, Volume 1) and the Chocolate Watchband.

Highs in the Mid-Sixties, Volume 1, Highs in the Mid-Sixties, Volume 3, and Highs in the Mid-Sixties, Volume 20 also showcase music from Los Angeles; while two of the later CDs in the Pebbles series, Pebbles, Volume 8 and Pebbles, Volume 9 feature bands from throughout Southern California.

Release data
This album was released in 1983 as an LP by AIP Records (as #AIP-10004).

Notes on the tracks
The Bees are the band that produced the classic psychedelic rock song, "Voices Green and Purple" (included on Pebbles, Volume 3), which is also the color scheme for this album's cover.  Side 2 opens with what is probably the earliest recording of the early Monkees hit.  The Sandals are best known for providing the score for the legendary surfing movie, the Endless Summer.  The Satans appeared on Pebbles, Volume 2 with "Makin' Deals", a song that anticipated "Sympathy for the Devil".  "Let Me In", by the Second Helping, featured Kenny Loggins on vocals in his first recording effort; Loggins wrote the song, one of three compositions released by the band as singles. The song is also found on Pebbles, Volume 9.

Track listing

Side one

 Terry Randall: "S.O.S."
 People of Sunset Strip: "Sunset Symphony"
 The Sandals: "Tell Us Dylan"
 The Chymes: "He's Not There Anymore"
 The Bees: "Trip to New Orleans"
 The Roosters: "One of These Days"
 Tangents: "Hey Joe, Where You Gonna Go?"
 Ken & The Fourth Dimension: "Rovin' Heart"

Side two
 W.C. Fields Memorial Electric String Band: "I'm Not Your Stepping Stone"
 The Satans: "Lines and Squares"
 The Dirty Shames: "I Don't Care"
 The No-Na-Mee's: "Gotta Hold On"
 Opus 1: "Back Seat '38 Dodge"
 The Second Helping: "Let Me In"
 The Grim Reepers: "Two Souls"
 The Nite Walkers: "High Class"

Pebbles (series) albums
1983 compilation albums
Music of Los Angeles